Mille Collines, French meaning "thousand hills", may refer to:
 Rwanda generally, often referred to as the "Land of a thousand hills" (French: Pays des Mille Collines)
 Hôtel des Mille Collines, a hotel built in Kigali 1973, Rwanda
 Radio Télévision Libre des Mille Collines, the former Rwandan radio station broadcasting 8 July 1993 to 31 July 1994 and playing a significant role during the 1994 Rwandan genocide.